"I Write the Songs" is a popular song written by Bruce Johnston in 1975 and released on his album Going Public in 1977. Barry Manilow's version reached number one on the Billboard Hot 100 chart in January 1976 after spending two weeks atop the Billboard adult contemporary chart in December 1975. It won a Grammy Award for Song of the Year and was nominated for Record of the Year in 1977. Billboard ranked it as the No. 13 song of 1976.

The original version was recorded by Captain & Tennille, who worked with Johnston in the early 1970s with the Beach Boys. It appears on their 1975 album Love Will Keep Us Together. The first release of "I Write the Songs" as a single was by teen idol David Cassidy from his 1975 solo album The Higher They Climb, which was also produced by Johnston. Cassidy's version reached number 11 on the UK Singles Chart in August of that year.

Johnston has stated that, for him, the "I" in the song is God, and that songs come from the spirit of creativity in everyone. He has said that the song is not about his Beach Boys bandmate Brian Wilson.

Manilow was initially reluctant to record the song, stating in his autobiography Sweet Life: "The problem with the song was that if you didn't listen carefully to the lyric, you would think that the singer was singing about himself. It could be misinterpreted as a monumental ego trip." After persuasion by Clive Davis, then president of Arista Records, Manilow recorded the song, and his version of "I Write the Songs" was the first single taken from the album Tryin' to Get the Feeling. It first charted on the Billboard Hot 100 on November 15, 1975, reaching the top of the chart nine weeks later, on January 17, 1976.  Cash Box said of Manilow's version "Good work Barry" describing the song as "melodic, ballad-like beginning grows into an operatic crescendo, all done in clear production that all age groups will appreciate." Record World called it "an uplifting production number" and "perhaps [Manilow's] strongest offering since 'Mandy.'"

Chart performance

Weekly charts
David Cassidy

Barry Manilow cover

Year-end charts

All-time charts

Popularity 
After his version reached number one, Manilow himself composed a novelty song based on this song which he recorded under the title "I Really Do Write the Songs" in which he sings about how he composes each part of a song and the line "Sometimes I really do write the songs" at the end of each verse. In the finale he sings, "sometimes...ah, what the hell...I write the songs." Unreleased at the time, it was included as a bonus track on the reissue of his album This One's for You in 2006.

Cover versions 
In 2014 the song also covered by Steve Dailisan, Johnson Manabat, Tetsuhiro Suzuki (a.k.a. Show Suzuki) & CD Argarin during the Eat Bulaga!'s "Videoke Dabarclash" segment.

See also 
 List of number-one adult contemporary singles of 1975 (U.S.)
 List of Hot 100 number-one singles of 1976 (U.S.)

References

External links
 
 

1975 singles
1976 singles
Barry Manilow songs
Billboard Hot 100 number-one singles
Cashbox number-one singles
Grammy Award for Song of the Year
Songs written by Bruce Johnston
David Cassidy songs
Songs about music
Song recordings produced by Ron Dante
1975 songs
Arista Records singles
RCA Records singles